Wister may refer to:

People
 Annis Lee Wister (1830–1908), American translator
 John Caspar Wister (1887–1982), American horticulturist
 Langhorne Wister (1834–1891), American Union Civil War brevet brigadier general
 Owen Wister (1860–1938), American author

Places
 Wister, Oklahoma
 Wister, Philadelphia, Pennsylvania
 Wister station, a SEPTA station
 Lake Wister, in Oklahoma
 Lake Wister State Park
 Mount Wister, in Wyoming

See also
Wistar (disambiguation)